Encelia frutescens is a species of flowering plant in the family Asteraceae known by the common names button brittlebush and bush encelia.

Distribution
This is a plant of the deserts in the Southwestern United States, especially the Mojave Desert in California, and also Nevada and Arizona.

Description
The Encelia frutescens flower heads usually, but not always, lack ray florets and are composed of only a disc packed with disc florets. The leaves are rough and hairy. The flat, light fruits are wind dispersed. This is an occasional food plant for the desert tortoise. It is one of the first plants to colonize disturbed or burned sites.

External links
Jepson Manual Treatment — Encelia frutescens
USDA Plants Profile for Encelia frutescens
Encelia frutescens Ecology
Encelia frutescens — U.C. Photo gallery

frutescens
Flora of the California desert regions
Flora of the Sonoran Deserts
Flora of Arizona
Flora of Nevada
Natural history of the Colorado Desert
Natural history of the Mojave Desert
Taxa named by Asa Gray
Flora without expected TNC conservation status